Mr. Local  is a 2019 Indian Tamil-language romantic comedy film written and directed by M. Rajesh. The film stars Sivakarthikeyan and Nayanthara in their second collaboration after Velaikkaran.

The principal photography of the film commenced around May 2018 and post-production was progressing as of February 2019. The film was released on 17 May 2019 to mostly negative reviews, with many critics panning the outdated plot.

Plot 
The film begins in a jail in Paris, where Manohar "Mano", who is from Chennai, India, has just been released on bail provided by the Indian Embassy. Before his release, he tells the jail warden about how he ended up in the Paris jail.

Mano is a middle-class youth who works as a salesperson in KUN Hyundai managed by Kuthala Sithambaram. One day, he meets with a minor accident involving Keerthana Vasudevan, an arrogant television producer. Keerthana soon develops a hatred for Mano, who constantly irritates her with his antics. Keerthana's hatred for Mano is such that she buys the KUN Hyundai showroom only to fire him, and she even goes to the extent of firing Sithambaram and Mano's friend Raja just because they oppose her decision of terminating Mano.

Mano soon develops romantic feelings for Keerthana, but this only increases the friction between the two. Later, Keerthana meets with an accident and is admitted to the hospital by Mano, who donates blood to her to save her life. Keerthana, who appears grateful to Mano for his gesture, invites him to Paris to meet her aunt and uncle and spend a few days with them, but this turns out to be a trap hatched by Keerthana to get rid of him once and for all. Keerthana speaks ill of Mano's family, which causes him to slap her in a rage. For this reason, he is arrested.

In the present day, following his release, Mano borrows the warden's motorbike to meet Keerthana before leaving for India. He sees Keerthana being chased by goons led by her fiancé Ashwin. She had called off the engagement after finding out that Ashwin is a transgender man and a misogynist as well. Mano saves Keerthana from Ashwin and his goons, after which he leaves for India. It is at this juncture that Keerthana realises that she too loves Mano. She returns to Chennai a few days later and accepts Mano's love.

Cast 

 Sivakarthikeyan as Manohar, an employee at Hyundai car showroom in Chennai
 Nayanthara as Keerthana Vasudevan, CEO of KV Entertainments
 Raadhika Sarathkumar as Easwari, Mano's mother
 Sathish as P. Raja, Mano's friend who also works at the showroom but gets fired by Keerthana
 Yogi Babu as Auto Sekar, Mano's area friend
 Robo Shankar as Kuthala Sithambaram, manager of the Hyundai showroom
 Narayan Lucky as Ashwin, a businessman and Keerthana's fiancé
 Thambi Ramaiah as Lakshman, Keerthana's uncle and KV Entertainments manager
 John Vijay as Arjun Reddy, Raja's personal lawyer
 Anil Murali as Inspector Prasanna Kumar, a corrupt policeman
 Eruma Saani Harija as Divya, Mano's sister
 Shalu Shamu as Asha Jasmine, an employee at the car showroom
 Thaadi Balaji as serial director
 Nakshatra Nagesh as Sowmiya, a serial artist
 G. Marimuthu as Mayilvaganam
 Subhashini Kannan as Manohar's relative
 Lizzie Antony as Keerthana's Advocate
 Krithika Laddu as Manohar's Relative Girl

Production 
Filming began in May 2018, marking Sivakarthikeyan's 13th film as lead actor. Portions of the film were shot in Chennai. The first look poster of the film was unveiled by actor Sivakarthikeyan himself through his Twitter account on 2 February 2019. The filmmakers confirmed that the film is not a remake of the 2017 Telugu hit film Nenu Local. The film was shot extensively in Baku, Azerbaijan.

Music 
The score and soundtrack were composed by Hiphop Tamizha. The lyrics were written by Hiphop Tamizha, Mirchi Vijay, K. R. Dharan, Rokesh, Paul B. Sailus and SanGan. Anirudh Ravichander, Benny Dayal, Sid Sriram and Sivakarthikeyan, sung one song each for the film. All songs were released as singles.

Release and reception 
Mr. Local was released on 17 May 2019 and received negative reviews from critics. Aditya Shrikrishna of Silverscreen called it Rajesh's "worst film" and criticised its lack of originality. The Times of India gave the film 2 out of 5 stars, saying "Sivakarthikeyan and Nayantara look good on screen, and that's the only positive factor in the film, which otherwise is full of ineffective one-liners, illogical scenes and exhausting dialogues and songs". Behindwoods gave it 2.0 out of 5, stating that "Mr. Local misses out on entertainment".

References

External links 

2019 films
2010s Tamil-language films
Indian romantic comedy films
Films shot in Chennai
Films scored by Hiphop Tamizha
Films shot in Azerbaijan
Films directed by M. Rajesh
2019 romantic comedy films